Hardwick-with-Yelford is a civil parish in West Oxfordshire. The parish includes the villages of Hardwick and Yelford. It was formed in 1932 from the parish of Yelford, most of the parish of Hardwick, and parts of the parishes of Ducklington and Standlake.

Sources

References

Civil parishes in Oxfordshire
West Oxfordshire District